Kuusi is a Finnish surname. Notable people with the surname include:

 Janne Kuusi (born 1954), Finnish television and film director, screenwriter, producer and occasional actor
 Kim Kuusi (born 1947), Finnish composer
 Matti Kuusi (1914–1998), Finnish folklorist, paremiographer and paremiologist

Finnish-language surnames